Mohammad Noordin bin Sopiee (26 December 1944 –  29 December 2005) was a Malaysian academician born in Penang. He was the chairman and chief executive officer of Institute of Strategic and International Studies (ISIS), a major think tank of  Malaysia.

Biography
He married Puan Sri Shamsiah Hashim in 1968 and they have three sons: Johan, Shamsul and Amirul. On 29 December 2005, he died in Kuala Lumpur and was buried at Bukit Kiara Muslim Cemetery. Malaysia's top leaders and important figures attended his funeral and mourned his death. In numerous interviews given by his youngest son, Amirul, he said that he had learned a lot from his father who was a simple and enigmatic man. He would do anything for his country, said Amirul.

Throughout 1963, Sopiee ran a series of seminars pertaining to Indonesian threats to Malaysia in the sphere of psychological warfare.

Honour

Honour of Malaysia
  : Commander of the Order of Loyalty to the Crown of Malaysia (P.S.M.) (1997)

References

Office, Information Research Department: Indonesia; Propaganda 'Radio' Broadcasts Following Attempted Coup. FCO 168/1668.The National Archives. London, Kew.

1944 births
2005 deaths
Malaysian people of Malay descent
Malaysian academics
People from Penang
Commanders of the Order of Loyalty to the Crown of Malaysia